Tetangga Masa Gitu? (often abbreviated to TMG; English: What An Annoying Neighbour!) is a sitcom that follows the daily lives of two couples. The first couple, Adi and Angela, has been married for ten years, and the second couple, Bastian and Bintang, is newly married. This sitcoms compares the long- and newly married couples with their daily problems that they face. They live in the same block and are neighbors. The series premiered on March 20, 2014, on NET.

Characters
Angela Schweinsteiger (played by Sophia Latjuba)—Angel is Adi's wife. She has been married to Adi for ten years. Her mother is Indonesian, but her father is German. She is a lawyer graduated from University of Indonesia. Despite her high income, Angel is known for her penny-pincher personality, especially to Adi. She always asks for something from her neighbors, Bastian and Bintang. She often practices pilates and yoga. She is a little bit over protective to Adi, and she always tries to force Adi to change his lifestyle. She likes to make havermout for Adi's breakfast, but Adi never eats it.
Adi Putranto (played by Dwi Sasono)—Adi is Angel's husband. He has been married to Angel for ten years. He only has two friends, Bastian, his neighbor, and Mamat, a primary school student. He used to teach art in Matahari High School, but now he works at Mamat's Primary School. He is a couch potato, and his only entertainment is to annoy his neighbors. He often eats breakfast in Bastian and Bintang's house because Angel never makes him breakfast except for havermout. He likes to eat instant noodles, which he calls 'Milam' (Mie Malam-Malam) (English : Midnight Noodles) and plays PlayStation at the rental place with his friend, Mamat. He collects keris and other antiques.
Bastian Irawan (played by Deva Mahenra)—Bastian is Bintang's husband. He used to work as a detergent salesman, but now he works as an event organizer in a toy store. Even though he is not as smart as his wife, Bintang, he is very romantic. He often gives Bintang roses and does romantic stuff to Bintang. He likes to read comics and acts like a comic book character. He also collects action figures.
Bintang Howard Bornstein (played by Chelsea Islan)—Bintang is Bastian's wife. Her mother is Indonesian, but her father is American. She is beautiful. Her IQ is 186, and she graduated from Harvard University. Her nickname is "Walking Wikipedia" because she is very smart. She opens an online shop. Bintang always says a very long "So Sweet" when Bastian does something romantic. When Bastian didn't obey her wishes, she started crying like a poodle. She likes to cook even though she's actually bad at it, and Bastian never tells her about it.

Production 
Tetangga Masa Gitu had its last filming day on 17 January 2017.

Episode

Season 1 
 1. Rumah Baru dan Meja Pimpong / New House & Ping Pong Table  
Bastian & Bintang have moved to their new house with their new neighbors Adi & Angel, and Bastian plans to have a ping pong table.
 2. Cincin Kawin / Wedding Ring 
Angel is jealous because of Bintang's ring and their proposal is better than hers was.
 3. Rayuan Pulau Kelapa / Coconut Island Appeal
Bastian sings and begs to Bintang to get what he wants. This works, so Adi tries to do the same to Angel.
 4. Microwave 
It is Bintang's birthday, and Bastian wants to keep it a surprise.
 5. Maradona dari Gunung Kidul / Maradona from Kidul Mountains
Angel will remove every item in Adi's soccer collection if Adi doesn't know soccer. Meanwhile, Bastian hates matching clothes, but Bintang likes them. 
 6. Kenangan Borobudur / A Bad Memory In Borobudur
Fourteen years ago, Angel ripped her pants in public at Candi Borobudur. The public (and Adi) laughed at her, making her angry with Adi and breaking up with him. Fortunately, Adi apologized to Angel, and Angel accepted it if he promised to not tell anyone. Now, he breaks his promise by telling the story to Bastian and then Bintang.
 7. Cemburu / Jealousy
Adi is jealous of Angel's student, who is younger and more handsome than he.
 8. Kondangan Rempong / A Complicated Wedding Reception
Adi and Angel are preparing to go to a friend's wedding. Meanwhile, Bintang wants to sleep but is disturbed by Adi, Angel, and Bastian.
 9. Bastian Ulang Tahun / Bastian's Birthday
It is Bastian's birthday, but Adi does not give Bastian a present, making him think that he hates Bastian. So Adi gives him a watch but accidentally gives him a 3 million Rp watch rather than a 50 Rp watch.
 10. Mertua Angel Datang / Angel's Mother-in-Law is Coming
Angel hates Adi's mother because she always complains to her. Adi's whole family hates her.
 11. Gagal Ke Puncak / Failed To Go To Puncak
Adi, Angel, Bastian, and Bintang plan to visit Puncak to go camping, but something always goes wrong.
 12. Berlomba dalam Kuis / Competing On Quiz
After Bintang ruins Bastian's favorite quiz show (Because She is super smart), he and Adi challenge Bintang and Angel for a quiz, which they lose.
 13. Bisnis Online / Online Business
Bintang starts her own online business.
 14. Suami-Suami Jatuh Sakit / The Husbands Are Sick 
Bastian and Adi are sick, and Angel has to work, so she gets Bintang in charge.
 15. Ulang Tahun yang Terlupakan / Birthday That Got Forgotten
It is Angel's birthday, but Adi doesn't know about it.
 16. Tongsis / Selfie Stick
Bintang decides to retire from her online business. Meanwhile, Adi is obsessed with online shopping.
 17. Adi Kabur dari Rumah / Adi Ran Out From Home
After Angel accidentally uses Adi's favorite shirt as a wiping cloth, he runs out of the house and stays at Bastian and Bintang's house. Bastian is angry because it is his and Bintang's three month anniversary.
 18. Hut NET. Ke-1 / NET. 1st Birthday 
Bastian wins four tickets to the NET. Birthday Concert and gives them to his neighbor and his wife.
 19. Adi Rai
Bastian helps Adi to be healthy and strong by building a DIY gym in his house, but in the end it is all about boys v. girls (see Episode 12).
 20. Fogging
Bintang is scared of mosquitoes because of a tragic illness that happened when she was a child.
 21. Adi Cidera, Bastian Menderita / Adi is Hurt, Bastian is Suffering
Adi hurts his knee, so Angel wants Bastian to take care of him.
 22. Me Time 
Bintang wants some time alone but is always disturbed by Bastian, Adi, and Angel.
 23. Musim Kawin / Wedding Season
Bintang doesn't want to go to Bastian's friend's wedding because the friend is her ex. Meanwhile, Adi doesn't want to go to Angel's friend's wedding at Surabaya unless he is sick.
 24. Truth or Dare
Adi and Angel are bored, so they play with Bastian and Bintang. But they play too much and make Bastian and Bintang tire of them.
 25. Adi Sakit Gigi / Adi has Toothache
After eating too much ice cream, Adi has a toothache. Meanwhile, Bastian buys a karaoke machine.
 26. Dead Water
Adi and Angel's water system breaks, so they borrow water from Bastian and Bintang.
 27. Frozen
Angel wants a new fridge, but Adi doesn't have the money. So he borrows Bintang and Bastian's fridge.
 28. Vacuum Cleaner 
Angel wants a new vacuum cleaner. Bintang hates her new vacuum cleaner from her uncle-in-law.
 29. Match Maker
The gang wants to make Bintang's cousin Fionna with Angel's work friend Freddy.
 30. Kangen / Longing for Someone
Bintang and Angel leave on a business trip, the first time they leave Bastian and Adi alone.
 31. Fanatik / Fanatic
Bintang is addicted to the K-drama Full House. Then, Bastian secretly becomes a fanatic. Meanwhile, at school, a student is a fan of Adi.
 32. Hell on Earth
Adi has a nightmare showing that he will go to hell if he doesn't stop lying, so he always says the truth. Meanwhile, Bastian cannot tell the truth about Bintang's new toy from Surabaya.
 33. Anger Management 
Adi has anger issues at Lebaran, so Angel teaches him meditation.
 34. Who Dun It
Someone steals Angel's 5m rupiah necklace.
 35. New Job
Bastian is promoted to a full-time worker, so he never has a lot of time with Bintang. Meanwhile, Angel is mad because Adi is still unemployed. In the end, Angel and Bintang realize that they want their husbands to be near each other rather than away.
 36. Week End Rasa Week Day / Weekend Feels Like Another Days
Bastian is jealous because a lot of guys like Bintang. Meanwhile, Adit, Adi's friend, stays with Angel and Adi rather than going to Bogor with his mother.
 37. Lebaran Sebentar Lagi / Lebaran Will Be Coming
Angel and Adi prepare to visit Angel's family for Lebaran. Meanwhile, Bintang is confused with Bastian's whole family.
 38. SIX Pack vs FAMILY Pack
After Bintang watches a movie and likes men with a 6-pack, Bastian tries to be healthy by eating less. Meanwhile, Angel hates Adi's eating a lot of carbs, making Angel order Adi on a diet of fruits and vegetables. So Adi and Bastian plan to give Bastian's food to Adi.
 39. Self Security
With too much security debt, Adi and Bastian start a stakeout.
 40. Interview Simalakama / A Dilemma Interview
Bastian prepares for an interview. Meanwhile, Adi thinks he wants to return to a teaching job.
 41. Monster Chef 
Bastian and Adi learns how to cook to help their wife. 
 42. Komik Bastian yang Hilang / Bastian's Comics Are Gone
Bintang accidentally throws Bastian's comics in the garbage. Meanwhile, Adi thinks Angel threw away his new painting.
 43. Sang Guru / The Teacher
Angel learns how to paint from Adi. 
 44. 17 Agustus (Spesial HUT Indonesia) / 17 August (Indonesian Independence Special)
Angel made Adi participate in an independence day's competition
 45. Drama Asisten Rumah Tangga / Maid's Drama
The gang needs a maid, but they don't have enough money for that. 
 46. Curhat Sahabat / The confide of Best Friend
Bintang's friend, Stella, came to Bintang's house because she's heartbroken. 
 47. Tamu dari Jerman / Guest From Germany
Angel's cousin Helga is coming To Jakarta, but Adi doesn't like her because she is twice as evil as Angel. Meanwhile, Bintang makes Padang food, but it is disgusting.
 48. Bayanganku Bayanganmu / My Shadow, Your Shadow
Angel wants Adi to get a job. Adi wants Angel to be a housewife. Bintang wants Bastian to get a job that he can do from home. Bastian thinks Bintang wants to have her own career. 
 49. Keris Kesayangan / The Beloved Keris
Angel accidentally sells Adi's Keris in Bintang and Bastian's yard sale
 50. My Dearest Little Sister 
Bastian's sister, Tania came to Bastian's house and annoys Bastian. Meanwhile, Adi is trying to avoid the debt collector. 
 51. Mimpi Ketemu Ikan / A Dream Of Meeting A Fish
Adi dreams that if he paints a fish painting, he'll be famous. So he tries every way to paint a fish painting, and annoys the rest of the gang. 
 52. Liburan Bareng Yuk !!! / Lets Go On The Holiday Together !!!
The gang is ready for a holiday to Bali (this episode is sponsored by Wall's Corneto Mini)

Season 2 
 53. Twitwar
Bintang thinks that Bastian is cheating on her via Twitter. Meanwhile, Adi makes his own Twitter account to annoy Bastian.
 54. Ayam Jago
Bintang wants a dog to accompany her while Bastian works. Meanwhile,  Adi found a chicken in front of his house. 
 55. Gara-Gara TV 
Angel wants a TV in the bedroom, but Adi doesn't want to; they fight for it. Meanwhile, Bastian is in his Batman phase, dressing, talking, and acting like Batman. 
 56. Mysterious Doll
Adi finds a doll in the basement. The gang thinks it is cursed. They became very paranoid after they watch The Conjuring. 
 57. Post Wedding
Angel is jealous because Bastian and Bintang got their pra-wedding album. So, Angel and Adi decided to have their own wedding album. 
 58. Sportif
The entire neighbourhood is having a ping pong competition, so Angel decided to play against Adi and Bintang, but Bintang gets a huge order, making her tired. Meanwhile, Bastian is worried because he doesn't know how to play ping pong. 
 59. Motivator
Angel and Bintang think it's strange that Bastian and Adi are doing household chores. 
 60. Nostalgia di Hari Minggu
Bastian and Bintang planned to go to a zoo weeks ago. Meanwhile, Adi is dying to go to the mall. 
 61. Misteri Surat Cinta
Bastian found a love letter wrote by Bintang. Adi found a love letter that someone wrote for Angel. 
 62. PS4 Gulipat
Adi and Bastian bought a PS4. 
 63. Little Trouble Monster
Bintang signed up to a make-up course. Meanwhile, Angel's nephew, Kamila is staying for the day at Angel's house. 
 64. Keris Masa Gitu 
 65. Made in India
 66. The Fault in Our Stars
Based on a movie, Bintang dreams that Bastian is dead.
 67. Inspirasi yang Tertunda
 68. Bi Yuti
 69. Cerita di Bioskop
 70. Gara-Gara Buku
 71. Pekerjaan Baru
 72. Tetangga Baru
 73. Kupon Undian
 74. Basmeo-Biliet
 75. Misi Perdamaian 
 76. Konser Rock !!!
 77. Rahasia Angel 
 78. Harvard Malang
 79. Japan Here Were Come 
Bastian gets a task in Japan, so he brings Bintang to Japan. But she takes it too far.
 80. Pesta Halloween 
 81 - 82 . New School
 83. Casting
 84. Teman Masa Gitu
 85. Where's My  Phone
 86. Guru Masak Ku 
 87. Behind Bars
 88. Sang Maestro 
 89. Insomnia
 90. Asli atau Palsu ?
 91. Uang Tabungan 
Angel has a case box that Adi thinks is full of money.
 92. Who's The Boss
 93. Precious Painting
 94. Hipnotis (Hypnotic) 
Scared of enemies, Adi and Angel learn hypnotism.
 95. Dynamo Man 
A black out happens in the neighborhood, and the gang has to find time for night.
 96. Adi Jadi Dua
 97. Angel's Big Case
 98. Woman Bad Habits
 99. Kursus Adi Bintang
 100. Lebih Baik Sakit Hati
 101. Girl's Night Out 
Bastian's young sister is here from Bandung, and he is protective of her. Angel needs protection, so she calls Bastian's sister to teach her Thai boxing.
 102. Connection Lost
 103. Abrakadabra
Adi and Bastian bet each other on who is better at magic tricks, and the loser must cook the winner meals for a week (except Bintang has to buy the food).
 104. Boys Will Be Boys
 105. Hari Jadian
 106. Almoust Famous
 107. Waspada Bencana
 108. Surat yang Tertukar / Switched Letter
Because of the rain and address, their letters have been ruined and switch, making Bintang believe that she graduated from cooking class and making Adi think that Angel will die.
 109. Tikus
The gang must figure out how to get rid of mice in their houses.
 110. Lilin Terapi 
 111. Homo Modernicus
 112. Make Over
 113. Terjebak Diet
 114. Biang Rusuh 
 115. Special Natal
 116. Bintang Times Out 
 117. Where Is It ? 
 118. I Want to be Millionaire
 119. Tahun Baru
 120. Panas Lemas
 121. Go Green 
 122. Baby Sitter 
 123. Gara-Gara Hujan 
 124. Eksperimen Bintang
 125. Bastian Sekolah Lagi / Back To School For Bastian 
Bastian goes back to university to get a higher level.
 126. BBM Benar-Benar Masalah
 127. Pameran Lukisan
 128. Sakit Cacar / Chicken Pox 
Angel gets chicken pox, and the gang is worried about contagion.
 129. TV Addict
 130. Kena Embargo
 131. Time is Money
 132. Cenayang
 133. Spesial 1st Anniversary Bastian-Bintang
 134-138. No Amazing Race
 139-143. Ada Ular di Rumahku / There's a Snake In My House
 144-147. Gara-Gara Sulis / Because Of Sulis
 148. Misteri Legging
 149. Ngamuk di Twitter
 150. Valentine
 151-152. Ketagihan Batu
 153. Sleeping Disorder
Because Bintang says no to Bastian for buying the limited edition of the Tarzan comic, Bastian sleepwalks as Tarzan and ruins Bintang's beauty sleep until Adi and Angel come to record it and upload it to YouTube. Bastian is angry, and Bintang buys him his limited edition.
 154. Surprise Party Special Imlek
 155-159. Perang Panas Dingin / Hot & Cold War

Although Its Having 5 Part There The Main Story.

Adi Part:
Adi is meeting a new counselor at his school, who does nice things for Adi, making Angel jealous. But after a selfie, the principal fires him and the student and counselor say goodbye forever.

Angel Part:
Angel and her enemy are fighting each other, and her enemy says that Angel is cheating (despite needing her friend's laptop). She gets fired but her boss doesn't believe her, so he brings back Angel.

Bastian & Bintang Part :
Bastian admits to Bintang that her food is bad, so they have a little chef showdown to find out who is better at cooking.

 160. Parno to The Max 
 161-163. Cincin Cenat Cenut / Cenat Cenut Ring
 164-166. Ga Tahan Johan / Can't Stand Johan
 167-171. After The War 
Angel loses a case, losing the company 50 million rupiahs. The boss is angry and fires her, making Adi and Angel sad. Worse, Bastian and Bintang move to Pondok Indah, despite Bintang's father buying her a nice house. Adi wants to bribe Angel's boss to get her job back. He says he will do anything, so the boss says he can get Angel back in the company if he drinks three big bottles of ginger juice (Jahe), making him and the boss drunk in the end. Angel gets her job back, and Bastian and Bintang do not move; in fact, their purpose home is sold to Angel's client enemy.
 172-174. Cicak vs Komodo / Komodo Vs Lizard
 175. Tas Mahal Angel (New Fashion)
 176. Tas Mahal Angel (Istri Bekerja VS Di Rumah)
 177. Tas Mahal Angel (Aliran PAM Mati)
 178. Tas Mahal Angel (Bastian Sok Atlet)
 179. Tas Mahal Angel (Ulah Pak RT)
 180. Reuni (Ariel)
 181-183. MLM
 184. Paket Misterius (My Honey Bunny)
 185. Paket Misterius (Family Gathering Bagian 1)
 186. Paket Misterius (Family Gathering Bagian 2)
 187-189. Second Honeymoon
 190-194. Istriku Jenius / My Wife Is A Genius
 195. Semangat Curhat
 196. English Test Bikin Stres
 197. Milam / Midnood ( Midnight Noodles )
After Angel prohibits him from ever eating milam again, Adi goes to a local food vendor that sells it. He pays by working there, but he is caught when Angel sees him at the food vendor.
 198. Pohon Tetangga ( Neighbor Tree )
Angel thinks that Bintang's favorite tree in her garden is a caterpillar factory. When Adi sees Bastian cutting some branches from Bintang's favorite tree, she is mad and convinces Angel to stop cutting the tree because the electric wire will collapse. Angel doesn't believe it but she will not cut it if it is not a caterpillar factory.
 199. Privacy
The Gang Have Problem With Their Privacy In Their Phone
 200-201. A Weekend Without You
The girls take a trip to Garut, and the boys must find how they will spend it without them for the weekend.
 202. Mikir Kalo Parkir
 203. Terserah Jadi Masalah
 204. Kulkas
 205. Story Of Shooting Star
 206. Gara-Gara Timbangan
 207. Deman Marathon
 208. Senam Wajah
 209. C.O.C.
 210-211. Hello Horror
 212. Cuci Kaki
 213-214. Cinderella
After an argument in which Bastian does not like Adi's painting to give to his boss, Bintang tries to apologize by bringing Angel home, except she forgets, despite the rain. She redeems herself by doing her job when she gets the flu. Meanwhile, Angel will sell Adi keris if he does not get five interviews.
 215. War Of Colors
 216. When Everything Changes

Special 

217. Cerita Bintang Howard Bornstain (Chelsea Islan) ( Bintang Story With Chelsea ) 
We Going To Look Deeper About Bintang With Chelsea
218. Cerita Bastian Irawan (Deva Mahenra) ( Bastian Story With Deva )
We Going To Look Deeper About Bastian With Deva
219. Cerita Angela Schweinsteiger (Sophia Latjuba)( Angela Story With Sophia )
We Going To Look Deeper About Angel With Sophia
220. Cerita Adi Putranto (Dwi Sasono) ( Adi Story With Sasono ) 
We Going To Look Deeper About Adi With Sasono
221. Cerita Bersama ( Our Story ) 
We Going To Look Deeper About The Gang With The Cast

Season 3 

 222. Paket Nyasar
 223. Ditegur Kantor
 224. Calon Ayah
 225. Trik Hemat Ala Angel
 226. Lemari Display
 227. Alis Mata Angel
 228. Dendam Dari Masa Lalu
 229. Pak Guru Tersayang < My Favorite Teacher >
There A Student That Bad Of Adi Learning Their Parents Give Them Food Basket To Up The Grade. Adi Didn't Want To But Angel Don't Care
 230. Promosi Bastian
 231. Jujur Dong
 232. Where's My Ring
 233. Sampahmu Bukan Sampahku
 234. Pesta Ultah (OKE)
 235. Sedia Helm Sebelum Motor
 236. Spooky Traveler
 237. Ada Apa Dengan Ucup
 238. Tangan Adi Sakit
 239. Candle Light Supper
 240. Bugar Bikin Segar
 241. Susahnya Niat Batal
 242. Menahan Amarah
 243. Mood On The Wall
 244. Jujur Enak Tidur
 245. PayDay
 246. Blast From The Past
 247. Malaikat Vs Setan
 248. Everybody Happy
 249. Pamer Kebaikan
 250. Sok Kuat Puasa
 251. Berbagi Kebaikan
 252. Sumbangkan Dan Ikhlaskan
 253. Goodbye Ayay, Hello Momon
 254. Swadaya Buka Puasa
 255. Petasan Vs Sakit
 256. Puasa Jangan Gosip
 257. THR (Tak Harus Resah)
 258. My Name Is Not Adi
 259. Pacaran Lagi
 260. Mudik Impian
 261. Spesial Idul Fitri
 262. Kartu Kredit Bikin Melilit
 263. Critics No More
 264. KDRT Jadi Masalah RT
 265. Old Bas, New Bas
 266. Kacau Tanpa Bintang
 267. Tukar Mobil, Tukar Sepatu
 268. Lupa Lupa Ingat
 269. Cinta Tapi Jauh
 270. Order Tapi Maksa
 271. Not A Superwoman
 272. Style Stealer
 273. Kembalinya kamila
 274. Jangan Kurangi Cinta Dan Uang Belanja
 275. Titip Burung, Titip Masalah
 276. The Coffee Story
 277. Salon Yakuza
 278. Mancing Keributan
 279. Boot
 280. Si Jago Masak
 281. Shoe Business
 283. Pijat Refleksi
 284. Romansa Masa Lalu
 285. To Do List
 286. Nightmare di Rumah Adi
 287. Basket & Pride
 288. Fixed It
 289. Hot, Spicy & Macho
 290. Dipaksa Bebas
 291. Tania Ingin Jadi Girlband
 292. Inframe
 293. Pilihlah aku Jadi RTmu
 294. Last Wish
 295. Pembenaran vs Kebenaran
 296. Over The Seas
 297. Sekutu Buat Adi
 298. Mendekatkan yang jauh, Menjauhkan yang dekat
 299. Gowes Sepeda
 300. Ondel-Ondel
 310. Mom Vs Daughter
Bastian Is In The Middle Of Fight Between His Sister Tania ( Shania Junianatha From JKT48 ) And His Mother About Tania Trip To Do Hiking In Mount Everest
 311. Single Unhappy
 312. Panas Luar Dalam
 385. Helper
Tania ( Shania Junianatha From JKT48 ) Wants To Build Her Own Online Business Much Off Bastian Concern Meanwhile Adi Enough Of Angel Stopwatch System So He Proved Angel That He Can Be On Time Without Stopwatch System.
 339. Salah Order ( Wrong Order )
Angel Boss Order Angel To Order A Cake For His Daughter Birthday, Because The Bakery Is Near Adi School Angel Wants Adi To Order The Cake But It Get Wrong, Instead Of Frozen Theme The Cake Is Barbie Theme.
 403 Susah Tidur ( Hard To Sleep )
Adi Have Problem To Sleep Meanwhile The Rest Of The Neighborhood Is Searching For Their Neighbor Daughter Cat.
 465. Demam JKT48 ( JKT48 Fever )
Bastian Is In A Pickle When Tania ( Shania Junianatha From JKT48 ) Bastian Sister Is Threatening His Brother To Spill His Secret About His Love For JKT48 To Bintang Meanwhile Adi Learn How To Be Independence For The First Time Since Angel Went To Business Trip ( Special Guest Star : Melody Nurramdhani Laksani, Nabilah Ratna Ayu Azalia & Jessica Veranda Tanumihardja Of JKT48 )

Accolades

References

Indonesian comedy television series
2010s sitcoms
Television series about marriage
NET (Indonesian TV network) original programming